Jawara is an Indonesian soap opera, produced by SinemArt. It was first aired on RCTI on June 6, 2016.

Cast 
 Ben Kasyafani as Encep
 Kenang Mirdad as Ading
 Irish Bella as Annisa
 Rama Michael as Fadil
 Aura Nabilla as Zinni Kasya
 Kevin Kambey as Oman
 Temon as Satibi
 Selvo Salvatore as Aki Bashir
 Wina Zulfiana as Halimah
 Valarke Stahl as Hidayati
 Dini Savitri as Mother Hidayati
 Raymon as Musa
 Royhan as Rojak
 Burhanudin as Father Annisa
 Gilang Rino as Sukirman
 Cici Tegal as Wife Satibi

References

External links 
 

2016 Indonesian television series debuts
Indonesian television soap operas